Okairy Alejandra Giner Arredondo (born November 30, 1992 in Camargo, Chihuahua, Mexico), better known as Oka Giner, is a Mexican actress who gained popularity for her debut role as Bárbara Fuenmayor in the 2013 Mexican television series, Gossip Girl: Acapulco.

Early life
Giner was born in Camargo, Chihuahua. As a child, she participated in beauty pageants. When she was 17 years old, she modeled locally, appearing in photo shoot for the online newspaper "El Diario de Chihuahua" in 2010. She also studied Polynesian dances such as Hawaiian and Tahitian for 11 years. Giner showed an interest in performing from an early age, directing and acting in plays with her cousins during family gatherings. Later, she enrolled at Autonomous University of Chihuahua, where she majored in Communication sciences.

Acting career
Giner studied briefly at university, but soon left and successfully auditioned for the Centro de Educación Artística, the free drama school run by  Televisa. In January 2012, she moved from Camargo to Mexico City to attend school. While attending CEA, Giner gained acting experience by performing various in student-run productions. During her first year at CEA, she heard about an audition for producer Pedro Torres' latest project, Gossip Girl: Acapulco, a Spanish-language remake of the hit American series. Actress Mariana Van Rankin was originally cast as Bárbara Fuenmayor and filmed a short pilot episode. When she later dropped out, producers recast the role. Giner originally attended the casting call hoping to gain experience for future auditions. Although she had little professional training and no professional acting experience, she was cast in one of two lead roles. Giner was the last actor to audition and be cast in the series. The entire cast was officially announced in January 2013. Gossip Girl: Acapulco began filming in various locations in Acapulco, Mexico on January 21, 2013 and ended in May of that year. The show premiered exclusively on the subscription service channel, Golden Premier, on August 5, 2013. In spite of the show's success in Mexico, it was not renewed for a second season and was officially cancelled on January 14, 2014.

Following the completion of filming and promotion for Gossip Girl: Acapulco, Giner returned to CEA to begin her second year of school in July 2013. In March 2014, she auditioned for a lead role in the Televisa telenovela, Hasta el fin del mundo, but did not receive a part. She was instead cast in a recurring role in another series, Señorita Pólvora, in July 2014.

In September 2013, she was announced as a new celebrity spokesmodel for "Always Platinum", appearing in commercials for the brand in Mexico. Her short film, M de iMportante, was released on her official Twitter account via Vimeo in July 2014.

Giner then appeared in the Telemundo telenovela Bajo el mismo cielo which began airing on July 28, 2015. Its premiere episode garnered the highest ratings on Telemundo for a telenovela in 3 years. On August 8, 2015, she began filming the Telemundo telenovela drama ¿Quién es quién?, moving to Miami for the show's production. The telenovela premiered on October 26, 2015 on Gala TV in Mexico.

Personal life 
On December 10, 2022, Giner married comedian Nacho Redondo after three years of dating.

Filmography

Films

Television

Music video appearances

Awards and nominations

References

External links

Talent Agency Profile

1992 births
Living people
Mexican television actresses
Mexican film actresses
Actresses from Chihuahua (state)
21st-century Mexican actresses
People from Camargo, Chihuahua